Fernand Oubradous (12 February 1903 – 6 January 1986) was a French bassoonist, conductor and composer. Born in Paris, he studied in his native city with André Bloch. He composed a series of tutors called Enseignement Complet du Basson in three parts Published by Alphonse Leduc.
He taught at the Conservatoire National Superieur in Paris and at the Mozarteum in Salzburg. 
He founded the Academie Internationale d'Ete de Nice.
He died in Paris.

External links 
Biography
Site on Fernand Oubradous

Musicians from Paris
1903 births
1986 deaths
French classical bassoonists
French classical composers
French male classical composers
French male composers
French male conductors (music)
20th-century French conductors (music)
20th-century French composers
20th-century French male musicians